Quakers Hill railway station is located on the Richmond line, serving the Sydney suburb of Quakers Hill. It is served by Sydney Trains T1 Western and T5 Cumberland line services.

History

Quakers Hill station opened in 1872 as Douglas Siding. It was renamed Quakers Hill on 30 March 1905 and relocated to its present location on 29 June 1939. Two sets of points at the southern end of the station allow trains to terminate on either platform.

The station had a crossing loop until the line from Marayong was duplicated to Quakers Hill in 2002. In 2011, the second track was extended to Schofields with a new overhead concourse with lists completed at the same time. As a result, T5 Cumberland line services were extended to terminate at Schofields.

Platforms & services

Train Line and Services
During the week, Quakers Hill has four services an hour in both directions. Two of these services come from the city while the other two run between Schofields and Leppington. In the peak, Quakers Hill is serviced by six services an hour on the T1 Western Line. Late at nights, T1 Western Line services do not run to Quakers Hill and only 2 T5 Cumberland Line services run every hour between Leppington and Richmond.

On the weekends, the T1 Western Line operates a service from Richmond to North Sydney every 30 minutes which stops at Quakers Hill in both directions. Quakers Hill is also serviced by T5 Cumberland Line services on weekends with services running between Schofields and Liverpool.

Transport links
Busways operates two routes via Quakers Hill station:
732: Rouse Hill Station to Blacktown station via Schofields and Acacia Gardens
752: Rouse Hill Station to Blacktown station via The Ponds

Quakers Hill station is served by one NightRide route:
N71: Richmond station to City (Town Hall)

Trackplan

References

External links

Quakers Hill station details Transport for New South Wales

Easy Access railway stations in Sydney
Railway stations in Sydney
Railway stations in Australia opened in 1905
Railway stations in Australia opened in 1939
Richmond railway line
City of Blacktown